Lawrenceburg Junction is an unincorporated community in Dearborn County, Indiana, in the United States.

It took its name from Lawrenceburg.

References

Unincorporated communities in Dearborn County, Indiana
Unincorporated communities in Indiana